The Mäntsälä rebellion was a failed coup attempt by the Lapua Movement to overthrow the Finnish government.

On 27 February 1932 some 400 armed members of the Suojeluskunta militia interrupted a meeting of Social Democrats in Mäntsälä with small arms fire. This was a local event organized by the local chapter, but the national organization soon joined in. In the next few days, leading members of the Lapua Movement (Lapuanliike) and hundreds of armed members of Suojeluskunta arrived at Mäntsälä. The former Chief of General Staff, Major General Wallenius also joined the leadership of the rebellion. The men refused to disperse and demanded the cabinet's resignation and a change in political course.

Two days later, the cabinet ordered the leaders of the Lapua movement arrested using the Protection of the Republic Act which the movement itself had urged for a year before. Army units prepared as the Chief of Defence, Lieutenant General Aarne Sihvo was prepared to use force to end the rebellion. Orders were given to reinforce the defence of Helsinki with tanks and artillery in case the situation worsened. As the tensions grew, so did the consumption of alcohol among the instigators.

On 2 March President Pehr Evind Svinhufvud gave a radio speech in which he urged the militiamen to return home and promised that only the leaders would be punished. The President's speech was as follows:

The men dispersed and the leaders were arrested a few days later. In spring, the Lapua Movement was disbanded. Only a small part of the Suojeluskunta had joined the rebels, while the majority remained loyal to the government.

The Mäntsälä rebellion can be considered the last major radical-right-wing incident in Finland after the Civil War. In the coming years, the economic situation in Finland would improve and radical movements would lose support.

References

External links 

Rebellions in Finland
Political history of Finland
Rebellion
1932 in Finland
Coup d'état attempts in Europe
Conflicts in 1932
February 1932 events
March 1932 events
Political violence
Fascist revolts
Fascism in Finland